David Stanley may refer to:

 David S. Stanley (1828–1902), Union Army general during the American Civil War
 David M. Stanley (1928–2015), American politician in Iowa